Zarina Ahmad is the Climate Change and Environment Officer at the Council for Ethnic Minority Voluntary Organisation, Scotland, UK and an advocate for climate justice.

Career
Ahmad took B. Sc. Psychology at University of Glasgow from 1986 - 1990 and was President of the society of Asian Students. She worked as an accountant and book-keeper immediately after graduation and then for Fife Education where her role was to determine whether a child's learning difficulties were due to an undiagnosed learning problem or poor knowledge of English language.

When Ahmad managed a Scottish Climate Challenge Funded project in 2009, she realised that she met very few other people from a minority ethnic background at conferences and other meetings about environmental projects. Her personal background and experiences led to her to become an advocate for climate justice and diversity within environmental movements.

Since 2013 she has been the Climate Change and Environment Officer at the Council for Ethnic Minority Voluntary Organisations, Scotland, UK. This council is an intermediary in both directions between organisations and the Scottish government. Ahmad was appointed at a time when a Scottish government report had indicated that during the past four years only three ethnic minority groups had applied for funding on climate change issues from the Scottish Climate Challenge Fund, administered by Keep Scotland Beautiful. Ahmad considered that lack of knowledge, rather than lack of interest, was the reason.  She organised a conference where minority ethnic organisations and Scottish government representatives could meet, and also provided advice and mentorship.

The result has been that between 2013 and 2020 over 100 minority ethnic organisations have applied successfully to the Scottish Climate Challenge Fund. Some of the projects are very small, others large and long-term, but the personal knowledge of climate change of many people in the organisations meant that they were keen to become involved.

In 2015 Ahmad contributed to a Scottish Parliament enquiry into barriers to employment caused by race and ethnicity.

She has been an invited speaker on the subject of climate justice and also social and racial inequality at events such as Scottish Interfaith Week 2015 and an interfaith event in Glasgow in February 2020, a joint Chatham House and Glasgow Caledonian University research event in July 2020 and a member of a discussion panel about feminist perspectives on climate change at a European Union-funded conference in September 2020.

Ahmad runs the Ethnic Minority Environmental Network that provides training in environmental activism, from the point of view of social and climate justice.

Awards
 In November 2020 she was included in the BBC Radio 4 Woman's Hour Power list 2020.

References

Living people
Alumni of the University of Glasgow
British women activists
British environmentalists
Scottish activists
British charity and campaign group workers
Year of birth missing (living people)